Thimatchipuram Rajagopal Raghunath (16 July 1912 – 2 January 1990) was an Indian film director. He was the younger brother of film director Raja Chandrasekhar.

Career 
Raghunath started his film career as an assistant director in Gnanasoundari (1935). He then worked as a sound recordist in Dhara Sasangam (1936) for Sreenivasa Cinetone before making his directorial debut the same year with Kizhattu Mappillai. He directed more than 30 films in Tamil. M. G. Ramachandran featured in minor roles in a couple of his films during 1940s. Subsequently, he directed M. G. Ramachandranin Raja Desingu movie, released in 1960, after much delay in production. 

Raghunath later went on to become a technical adviser at Karpagam Studios, after which he was appointed the President of the Madras branch of the Films Division of India (FDI).

Filmography

References

Bibliography

External links 

1912 births
1990 deaths
20th-century Indian film directors
Tamil film directors
Malayalam film directors
Film directors from Thiruvananthapuram